Trade barriers are government-induced restrictions on international trade. According to the theory of comparative advantage, trade barriers are detrimental to the world economy and decrease overall economic efficiency.

Most trade barriers work on the same principle: the imposition of some sort of cost (money, time, bureaucracy, quota) on trade that raises the price or availability of the traded products. If two or more nations repeatedly use trade barriers against each other, then a trade war results. Barriers take the form of tariffs (which impose a financial burden on imports) and non-tariff barriers to trade (which uses other overt and covert means to restrict imports and occasionally exports). In theory, free trade involves the removal of all such barriers, except perhaps those considered necessary for health or national security. In practice, however, even those countries promoting free trade heavily subsidize certain industries, such as agriculture and steel.

Overview
High-income countries tend to have less trade barriers than middle income countries which, in turn, tend to have less trade barriers than low income countries. Small states tend to have lower trade barriers than large states. The most common trade barriers are on agricultural goods. Textiles, apparel and footwear are the manufactured goods which are most commonly protected by trade barriers. Tariffs have been declining in the last twenty years as the influence of the World Trade Organization has grown, but states have increased their use of non-tariff barriers.

According to Chad Bown and Meredith Crowley, world trade is "probably" vastly more liberal in current times than was the case historically. According to Ronald Findlay and Kevin H. O’Rourke, "for the nineteenth and twentieth centuries trade barriers and transport costs were the most important barriers to trade". They also write, "during the mercantilist era price gaps were as likely to be due to trade monopolies, pirates, and wars as to transport costs and tariffs, which are more easily quantifiable."

Georgetown University Professor Marc L. Busch and McGill University Professor Krzysztof J. Pelc note that modern trade deals are long and complex because they often tackle non-tariff barriers to trade, such as different standards and regulations, in addition to tariffs. Due to steadily decreasing tariff barriers since World War II, countries have become increasingly likely to enact trade barriers in forms other than tariffs. National firms often lobby their own governments to enact regulations that are designed to keep out foreign firms, and modern trade deals are one way to do away with such regulations.

The barriers can take many forms, including the following:

 Tariffs
 Non-tariff barriers to trade include:
 Import licenses
 Export control /  licenses
 Import quotas
 Subsidies
 Voluntary Export Restraints
 Local content requirements
 Embargo
 Currency devaluation
 Trade restriction

Impacts of trade barriers on business

Trade barriers are often criticized for the effect they have on the developing world.  Because rich-countries are able to set trade policies, goods, such as crops that developing countries are best at producing, still face high barriers.  Trade barriers such as tariffs on food imports or subsidies for farmers in developed economies lead to overproduction and dumping on world markets, thus lowering world prices to the disadvantage of farmers in developing economies who typically do not benefit from such subsidies. The Commitment to Development Index measures the effect that rich country trade policies actually have on the developing world.

Trade barriers are mostly a combination of conformity and per-shipment requirements requested abroad, and weak inspection or certification procedures at home. The impact of trade barriers on companies and countries is highly uneven. One particular study showed that small firms are most affected (over 50%).

Another negative aspect of trade barriers is that they result in a limited choice of products and would therefore force customers to pay higher prices and accept inferior quality.

Trade barriers obstruct free trade. Before exporting or importing to other countries, firstly, they must be aware of restrictions that the government imposes on the trade. Subsequently, they need to make sure that they are not violating the restrictions by checking related regulations on tax or duty, and finally they probably need a license in order to ensure a smooth export or import business and reduce the risk of penalty or violation.  Sometimes the situation becomes even more complicated with the changing of policy and restrictions of a country.

See also

 
 
 
 Free economic zone (includes Free Port).
 
 Free-trade area a region encompassing a trade bloc whose member countries have signed a free trade agreement. Such agreements involve cooperation between at least two countries to reduce trade barriers, import quotas and tariffs, and to increase trade of goods and services with each other. 
 North American Free Trade Agreement (NAFTA)
 South Asia Free Trade Agreement (SAFTA)
 European Free Trade Association
 European Single Market
 Union of South American Nations
 New West Partnership (An internal free-trade zone in Canada between Alberta, British Columbia, and Saskatchewan)
 Gulf Cooperation Council common market

References

External links

Databases on Trade Barriers
 ITC's Market Access Map, an online database of customs tariffs and market requirements
 ITC's Non-Tariff Measures Business Survey database, including regulatory and procedural obstacles that trading companies face both at home and abroad

International trade